The 1995–96 International Hockey League season was the fourth and last season of the International Hockey League, the top level of ice hockey in Russia. The league was replaced by the Russian Superleague for 1996-97. 28 teams participated in the league, and HK Dynamo Moscow won the Cup of IHL by defeating HK Metallurg Magnitogorsk in the final. But the champion was the team "HC Lada Togliatti".

Regular season

Western Conference

Eastern Conference

Second round

Final round

Qualification round

Playoffs

External links
Season on hockeyarchives.ru

1995–96 in Russian ice hockey leagues
International Hockey League (1992–1996) seasons